Holland Independent School District is a public school district based in Holland, Texas (USA). Located in Bell County, a small portion of the district extends into Milam County.

In 2009, the school district was rated "recognized" by the Texas Education Agency.

Schools
Holland High School (Grades 9–12)
Bowman Middle School (Grades 6–8)
Holland Elementary School (Grades PK-5)

References

External links
Holland ISD

School districts in Bell County, Texas
School districts in Milam County, Texas